Christian Larsen is a rower.

Christian Larsen may also refer to:

Christian Larsen (boxer) (born 1947), Danish Olympic boxer
Christian Magnus Sinding-Larsen (1866–1930), Norwegian physician and hospital director
Christian Albrekt Larsen (born 1975), Danish professor in comparative welfare studie

See also
Christian Larson (disambiguation)